In knitting, crochet and other textile arts, blocking is a final stage of handmade textile production that adjusts the shape of the finished piece. Not all pieces need blocking; however, blocking is standard for lace work and is not uncommon in sweaters, socks, and other solid projects. Through heat and moisture, blocking sets the stitches and standardizes the final dimensions, and may enhance the drape.  Hand manufacture places natural stresses on fabrics that may result in deviations from its intended shape and size.  Blocking is only effective on natural fibres but a technique called killing may be used on synthetic fibres to achieve an effect similar to blocking.

The degree of malleability is determined by the type of yarn used, with wool providing the most flexibility.  For projects that are produced in sections, blocking is normally done prior to final assembly.

Blocking methods

Blocking can be done in several different ways.  Depending on the method, the crafter may use rustproof pins, blocking wires, a steamer, or a steam iron.  A stable flat surface and towels are standard.  Fibres that tolerate water well may be wet blocked, shaping moist fabric into the desired shape and then allowing it to air dry.  Cold blocking uses no heat and less water to achieve the same result by spraying water upon the material instead of immersing the fabric.  Steam blocking uses a steamer or steam iron, but without applying direct pressure to the item.

Wet blocking 

Wet blocking is done by saturating a garment in warm water and allowing it to dry. Some items (especially lace) are stretched while wet with the use of pins and/or blocking wires, while others may be gently shaped without stretching.

Steam blocking 

Steam blocking is done by hovering a hot, steaming iron over the fabric. Hovering the iron about 1 or 2 inches above the fabric flattens the stitch, makes it thinner, and allows it to hold its shape better.  This is the only method that works for blocking synthetics, like acrylic.

Spritz blocking 

Spritz blocking involves spraying the garment with water. This relaxes the fibres more than steam blocking but less than wet blocking. Most often, a spray bottle is used.

Killing 
It is possible to set synthetic fibres through a process known as "killing", wherein the item is pinned in place and carefully steamed to achieve a very slight controlled melt of the fibres. Killed fabrics are permanently set and cannot be returned to their original form through washing.

Applications
Patchwork

References

External links 
Blocking information for different Fabrics on Knitty.com

Knitting methods for shaping
Crochet
Textile arts
Textile techniques